Eardley is both a surname and a given name. 

Notable people with the name include:

Surname:
Bert Eardley (born 1879), English footballer
Billy Eardley (1871–?), footballer
Constance Margaret Eardley (1910–1978), Australian botanist, lecturer and curator
Francis Eardley (1885–1954), footballer
George Harold Eardley (1912–1991), English recipient of the Victoria Cross
Joan Eardley (1921–1963), British artist
Jon Eardley (1928–1991), American jazz trumpeter
Neal Eardley (born 1988), Welsh international footballer
Richard Eardley (born 1928), mayor of Boise, Idaho

Given name:
Eardley Knollys (1902–1991), English artist and art dealer
Eardley Norton (1852–1931), Madras barrister, judge and politician of British origin
Eardley Peiris, radio announcer